Samson Singh can refer to:

 Samson Singh (cricketer) (born 1989), Indian cricketer
 Samson Singh (footballer) (born 1984), Indian footballer